Achiroides is a genus of small freshwater soles native to Southeast Asia.

Species
There are currently two recognized species in this genus:
 Achiroides leucorhynchos Bleeker, 1851
 Achiroides melanorhynchus (Bleeker, 1850)

References

Soleidae
Freshwater fish genera
Taxa named by Pieter Bleeker